Robert J. Lieber (born September 29, 1941) is an American academic and Professor of Government and International Affairs at Georgetown University in Washington, D.C. Lieber is the author or editor of a total of seventeen books and has served as the Chair of the Government Department and as Interim Chair of Psychology.

Education
Lieber completed his undergraduate degree in political science at the University of Wisconsin. Lieber spent a year in the Ph.D. program at the University of Chicago, where he studied with the distinguished realist scholar Hans Morgenthau. Lieber continued his graduate program in Government at Harvard, earning his doctorate in political science in 1968. At Harvard, Lieber took classes from distinguished scholars including Stanley Hoffmann, Samuel H. Beer, Louis Hartz, and the future Secretary of State, Henry Kissinger. Lieber accepted his first assistant professorship at the University of California, Davis. During his years at UCD, he took a number of research leaves, including a year's postgraduate study at St. Antony's College, Oxford and visiting research appointments at the Harvard Center for International Affairs, the Atlantic Institute and the Fondation Nationale des Sciences Politiques in Paris, and the Woodrow Wilson Center and Brookings Institution in Washington. He was appointed to a professorship at Georgetown in 1982, where he has taught ever since.

Public Intellectual 
Lieber has been invited on to various outlets to discuss topics including oil prices, American declinism, and American foreign policy strategy. He has been on The Diane Rehm Show, PBS Newshour and NBC's NewsConference to address current events and publicize his books. Lieber has made appearances on major American cable network programs, such as CNN's Crossfire and the O'Reilly Factor, as well as international television sources such as Al Jazeera and BBC. He has also been used as a source for the Washington Post, Christian Science Monitor, National Interest Online, and Roll Call for stories ranging from the Obama administration's foreign policy to Donald Trump, ISIS, and the 2016 Presidential Election.

In the policy realm, he has served as an advisor to several presidential campaigns, to the State Department, and to the drafters of U.S. National Intelligence Estimates. In early 1991, Lieber participated in a debate with Christopher Hitchens at Georgetown over the merits of the First Gulf War. Lieber supported the war while Hitchens opposed it.

Publications

Lieber has authored nine books since 1970, mostly on international relations theory, U.S. foreign policy, petroleum politics and European affairs. He has been the editor or co-editor of eight other books in the field. Most recently he has authored a series of books on American engagement and retrenchment in the 21st century, published by Cambridge University Press.

He has written pieces for the Washington Post, New York Times, National Interest, Los Angeles Times, Baltimore Sun, Christian Science Monitor, Harper's, and Salon.

His three most recent books, collectively referred to as the "American Futures Trilogy," including Retreat and Its Consequences: American Foreign Policy and the Problem of World Order (2016), Power and Willpower: Why the United States is Not Destined to Decline (2012), and The American Era: Power and Strategy for the 21st Century (2005) were published by Cambridge University Press.

"Reductio ad Iraqum" 
In his 2005 book, The American Era: Power and Strategy for the 21st Century, Lieber coined the neologism "Reductio ad Iraqum," to refer to the contentious political climate after the 2003 invasion of Iraq where debate on major foreign policy dilemmas often devolved into the blame game and reductive arguments over the consequences of the war. The phrase has continued to circulate around foreign policy analysis for at least a decade after its inception.

Personal life

Lieber appeared in Alfred Hitchcock's 1959 thriller North by Northwest as an extra.

Works
 The Oil Decade: Conflict and Cooperation in the West (1983)
 Power and Willpower in the American Future (2012)

See also 
 List of Georgetown University Faculty
 Declinism
 American Exceptionalism
 National Intelligence Estimate
 Council on Foreign Relations

References

External links

1941 births
Living people
 University of Wisconsin–Madison College of Letters and Science alumni
Harvard University alumni
Alumni of the University of Oxford
Georgetown University faculty